Dong Xuan may refer to:

 Dong Xuan (Han Dynasty) (董宣), style name Shaoping (少平), Eastern Han Dynasty official, see Book of the Later Han
 Đồng Xuân District, a district in Phu Yen Province, Vietnam
 Đồng Xuân Market, a market in Hanoi, Vietnam
 Dong Xuan (actress), a Chinese actress.